The  was an early private sexology research institute in Germany from 1919 to 1933. The name is variously translated as Institute of Sex Research, Institute of Sexology, Institute for Sexology or Institute for the Science of Sexuality. The Institute was a non-profit foundation situated in Tiergarten, Berlin. It was the first sexology research center in the world.

The Committee published the long-running journal . Hirschfeld built a unique library at the institute on gender, same-sex love and eroticism.

The institute pioneered research and treatment for various matters regarding gender and sexuality, including gay, transgender, and intersex topics. In addition, it offered various other services to the general public: this included treatment for alcoholism, gynecological examinations, marital and sex counseling, treatment for venereal diseases, and access to contraceptive treatment. It offered education on many of these matters to both health professionals and laypersons.

The Nazi book burnings in Berlin included the archives of the institute. After the Nazis gained control of Germany in the 1930s, the institute and its libraries were destroyed as part of a Nazi government censorship program by youth brigades, who burned its books and documents in the street.

Origins and purpose

The Institute of Sex Research was founded by Magnus Hirschfeld and his collaborators Arthur Kronfeld, a once famous psychotherapist and later professor at the Charité, and Friedrich Wertheim, a dermatologist. Hirschfeld gave a speech on 1 July 1919, when the institute was inaugurated. It opened on 6 July 1919. The building, located in the Tiergarten district, was purchased by Hirschfeld from the government of the Free State of Prussia following World War I. A neighboring building was purchased in 1921, adding more overall space to the institute.

As well as being a research library and housing a large archive, the institute also included medical, psychological, and ethnological divisions, and a marriage and sex counseling office. Other fixtures at the institute included a museum for sexual artifacts, medical exam rooms, and a lecture hall. The institute conducted around 18,000 consultations for 3,500 people in its first year. Clients often received advice for free. Poorer visitors also received medical treatment for free. According to Hirschfeld, about 1,250 lectures had been held in the first year.

In addition, the institute advocated sex education, contraception, the treatment of sexually transmitted diseases, and women's emancipation. Inscribed on the building was the phrase per scientiam ad justitiam (translated as "through science to justice"). This was also the personal motto of Hirschfeld as well as the slogan of the Scientific-Humanitarian Committee.

Organization
The institute was financed by the Magnus-Hirschfeld-Foundation, a charity which itself was funded by private donations. Along with Magnus Hirschfeld, a number of others (including many professional specialists) worked on the staff of the institute at different points in time, including:

  — psychiatrist
 August Bessunger — radiologist
 Karl Giese — archivist
 Berndt Götz — psychiatrist
 Hans Graaz — naturopath, medical doctor
 Friedrich Hauptstein — administrative director
 Kurt Hiller — lawyer
 Max Hodann — sex educator
  — anthropologist
 Hans Kreiselmaier — gynecologist
 Arthur Kronfeld — psychiatrist, psychologist

 Ewald Lausch — medical assistant
 Ludwig Levy-Lenz — gynecologist
 Eugen Littaur — otolaryngologist
 Franz Prange — endocrinologist
  — ethnologist
 Adelheid Rennhack — housekeeper
 Arthur Röser — librarian
 Bernard Schapiro — dermatologist, andrologist
 Arthur Weil — neuroendocrinologist, neuropathologist
 Friedrich Wertheim — dermatologist

Some others worked for the institute in various domestic affairs. Some of the people who worked at the institute simultaneously lived there, including Hirschfeld and Giese. Affiliated groups held offices at the institute. This included the Scientific-Humanitarian Committee, Helene Stöcker's  , and the World League for Sexual Reform (WLSR). The WLSR has been described as the "international face" of the institute. In 1929 Hirschfeld presided over the third international congress of the WLSR at Wigmore Hall. During his address there, he stated that "A sexual impulse based on science is the only sound system of ethics."

Divisions for the institute included ones dedicated to sexual biology, pathology, sociology and ethnography. Plans were allotted for the institute to both research and practice medicine in equal measure, though by 1925 a lack of funding meant the institute had to cut its medical research. This was to include matters of sexuality, gender, venereal disease, and birth control.

Activity

Public education 
The institute aimed to educate both the general public and specialists on its topics of focus. It became a point of scientific and research interest for many scientists of sexuality, as well as intellectuals and reformers from all over the world. Visitors included René Crevel, Christopher Isherwood, Harry Benjamin, Édouard Bourdet, Margaret Sanger, Francis Turville-Petre, André Gide and Jawaharlal Nehru.

The institute also received visits from national governments; in 1923 the institute was for instance visited by Nikolai Semashko, Commissar for Health in the Soviet Union. This was followed by numerous visits and research trips by health officials, political, sexual and social reformers, and scientific researchers from the Soviet Union interested in the work of Hirschfeld. In June 1926 a delegation from the institute, led by Hirschfeld, reciprocated with a research visit to Moscow and Leningrad.

One particular fixture at the institute which aided its popularity was its museum of sexual subjects. This was built with both education and entertainment in mind. There were ethnographic displays about different sexual norms across different cultures internationally. It included exhibits about sexual fetishism and sadomasochism. A collection of phallic artifacts from around the world was also exhibited. Additionally, there were presentations regarding the diversity of human sexual orientation, particularly with regards to homosexuality. Upon visiting the institute, Dora Russell reflected that it was "where the results of researches into various sex problems and perversions could be seen in records and photographs."

The neighboring property purchased in 1922 by the institute had an opening ceremony on 5 March 1922, after which it became a place for the institute's staff to interact with the public in an educational capacity. Lectures and question-and-answer sessions were held there to inform laypersons on topics of sexuality. The public especially tended to ask questions regarding contraception.

Sexual and reproductive health 
One focus of the institute's research and services was sexual and reproductive health. A subdivision of the institute called the Eugenics Department for Mother and Child offered marital counseling services, and the Center of Sexual Counseling for Married Couples provided access to contraception. It was especially a goal of the institute to make contraceptive services accessible to the poor and working-class of Germany. This was despite a prohibition on advertising birth control in the Weimar Republic's constitution. Following looser regulation on advertising contraceptive methods, the institute published an educational pamphlet on the matter in 1928 which ultimately reached a distribution of about 100,000 copies by 1932. Hirschfeld and Hodann developed pioneering strategies for sex counseling services that would inspire later practices. The institute also offered general gynecology services and treatment for venereal diseases. Experimental treatments for impotence were also implemented.

Sexual intermediacy 
At the institute, Magnus Hirschfeld championed the doctrine of sexual intermediacy. This proposed form of classification said that every human trait existed on a scale from masculine to feminine. Masculine traits were characterized as dominant and active while feminine traits were passive and perceptive. The classification was further divided into the subgroups of sex organs, physical characteristics, sex drive or sexuality, and psychological characteristics. Hirschfeld's belief was that all human beings possess both masculine and feminine traits regardless of their sex. In fact, he believed that no one was fully masculine or fully feminine but rather a blend of the two. A man with a female sex drive, for example, would be homosexual, whereas someone with male sex organs and mostly female psychological characteristics would likely be transgender. Hirschfeld originally used the term "sexual intermediaries" in the late nineteenth century to refer mostly to homosexual men and lesbians. However, this later expanded to include intersex people, cross-dressers, and transsexuals. His concept of broad sexual intermediacy among humans has been traced to roughly similar ideas held by Charles Darwin and Galen of Pergamon.

Transsexuality and transvestism 

Magnus Hirschfeld coined the term transsexual in a 1923 essay, Die Intersexuelle Konstitution. This identified the clinical category which his colleague Harry Benjamin would later develop in the United States; only about thirty years after its coining by Hirschfeld did the term enter wider use, with Benjamin's work. Hirschfeld also originally coined the term transvestite in 1910, and he sometimes used the term "extreme transvestites" or "total transvestites" to refer to transsexuals.

Transgender people were on the staff of the institute as receptionists and maids, as well as being among the clients there. Various endocrinologic and surgical services were offered, including an early modern sex reassignment surgery in 1931. In fact, "a majority" of transvestites expressed "the wish to be castrated", according to one PhD student that studied there. Hirschfeld originally advised against sexual reassignment surgeries, but came to support them as a means of preventing suicide among transsexual patients.

Ludwig Levy-Lenz, the institute's primary surgeon for transsexual patients, also implemented an early form of facial feminization surgery and facial masculinization surgery. Additionally hair removal treatments using the institute's X-ray facility were developed, though this caused some side effects such as skin burns. Professor of history Robert M. Beachy stated that, "Although experimental and, ultimately, dangerous, these sex-reassignment procedures were developed largely in response to the ardent requests of patients." Levy-Lenz commented, "[N]ever have I operated upon more grateful patients."

Hirschfeld worked with Berlin's police department to curtail the arrest of cross-dressers and transgender people, through the creation of transvestite passes. These were issued on behalf of the institute to those who had a personal desire to wear clothing associated with a gender other than the one assigned to them at birth.

Homosexuality 
A compilation of works about homosexuality could be found at the institute. The institute's collections included the first comprehensive such compilation of works about sexuality. Different from the Others, a film co-written by Hirschfeld that advocated greater tolerance for homosexuals, was screened at the institute in 1920 to audiences of statesmen. It also received a screening at the institute before a Soviet delegation in 1923, who responded with "amazement" that the film had been considered scandalous enough to censor.

Working off of the research of Eugen Steinach, who had recently succeeded in reversing the sexual behavior of animal test subjects, the institute once tested whether or not transplanting the testicles from a heterosexual man to a homosexual man would cure homosexuality. This method of "curing" homosexuality more often than not grew necrotized and resulted in the testicles having to be castrated. The practice was abandoned by the institute by 1924. Hirschfeld — who was homosexual himself — viewed homosexuality as natural and inborn, rather than an illness. The experiments were in fact intended to demonstrate the biological basis of homosexuality in the influence of sex hormones.

The institute put adaption therapy into practice as a far more humane and effective method than conversion therapy, as a means of helping patients cope with their sexuality. Rather than attempting to cure a patient's homosexuality, the focus was instead placed on helping the patient learn to navigate a homophobic society with the least discomfort possible. While the doctors at the institute could not outright recommend illegal practices (and, at this time, most all homosexual acts were illegal in Germany), they also did not promote abstinence. They made an effort to help their gay patients find a sense of community, either with other patients, through the Scientific-Humanitarian Committee, or through a network of venues known to the institute that were aimed at gay men, lesbians, and cross-dressers. Additionally, the institute offered them general psychological and medical assistance.

Intersexuality 
The institute presented expert reports about cases of intersex conditions. Hirschfeld is considered to have been a pioneer in this area of study. He advocated for the right of intersex individuals born with ambiguous genitalia to choose their own sex upon reaching the age of eighteen, and indeed assisted intersex people in attaining sex reassignment surgeries. However, he sometimes also advocated strategic sex assignment at birth, on a scientific basis. Photographs of intersex cases were among the collections at the institute — these were used as part of an effort to demonstrate sexual intermediacy to the average layperson.

Nazi era

Background 
From about the early 1920s onward, Hirschfeld became a target of the far-right in Germany, including the Nazi Party. He was physically attacked during multiple incidents, including an incident in Munich on 4 October 1920 in which he was badly injured. Deutschnationale Jugendzeitung, a nationalist paper, commented that it was "regrettable" Hirschfeld had not died. In another incident in Vienna, he was shot at. By 1929, frequent targeting by Nazis made it difficult for Hirschfeld to continue with his appearances in public. A caricature of him appeared on the front page of Der Stürmer in February 1929; the Nazi Party attacked his Jewish ancestry as well as his theories about sex, gender, and sexuality.

In late February 1933, as the influence of Ernst Röhm weakened, the Nazi Party launched its purge of gay (then known as homophile) clubs in Berlin, outlawed sex publications, and banned organised gay groups. As a consequence, many fled Germany (including, for instance, Erika Mann). In March 1933 Kurt Hiller, a lawyer affiliated with the institute, was sent to a concentration camp, where he was tortured, though he later fled Germany and survived the war.

Raids and book burnings 
On 6 May 1933, while Hirschfeld was in Ascona, Switzerland, the Deutsche Studentenschaft made an organised attack on the Institute of Sex Research. A brass band accompanied them as they arrived in the morning. After breaking into the building, the students destroyed much of what was inside, and looted tens of thousands of items — including works by authors who had been blacklisted in Nazi Germany. Following this, the leader of the students gave a speech before the institute, and the students sang Horst-Wessel-Lied. It is presumed that Dora "Dörchen" Richter (the first known person to undergo complete male-to-female sex reassignment surgery) may have been killed in this or a subsequent attack on the institute. Members of the Sturmabteilung (SA) appeared later in the day to continue looting the institute.

Four days later, the institute's remaining library and archives were publicly hauled out and burned in the streets of the Opernplatz by members of SA alongside the students. A bronze bust of Hirschfeld, taken from the institute, was placed on top of the bonfire. One estimate says that between 12,000 to 20,000 books and journals, and even larger number of images and sex subjects, were destroyed. Another estimate says that about 25,000 books were destroyed.

This included artistic works, rare medical and anthropological documents, and charts concerning cases of intersexuality which were prepared for the International Medical Congress, among other things. A collection of works about sexuality, in any one place, similar to the one stored at the institute was not compiled until the founding of the Kinsey Institute in 1947. Also seized were the institute's extensive lists of names and addresses. In the midst of the burning, Joseph Goebbels gave a political speech to a crowd of around 40,000 people. The leaders of the Deutsche Studentenschaft proclaimed their own Feuersprüche (fire decrees). Books burned at the Opernplatz at this time were not solely looted from the institute. Also burned were books by Jewish writers, and pacifists such as Erich Maria Remarque that were removed from local public libraries, bookshops, and the Humboldt University.

The bronze bust of Hirschfeld survived. A street cleaner salvaged and stored it the day after the burnings, and it was donated to the Berlin Academy of Arts after World War II. Reportedly also spared from the destruction were a large collection of psycho-biological questionnaires, pertaining to Hirschfeld's research of homosexuality. The Nazis were assured that these were simple medical histories. However, few of these have since been rediscovered.

Aftermath of raids 
A newspaper headline soon after the raids declared the "un-German Spirit" (or undeutschen Geist) of the institute. It was forced to shut down. The Nazis took control of the buildings for their own purposes. The destruction of the institute preceded a wider campaign against sexual reform and contraception, which were perceived as a threat to the German birth rate.

While many fled into exile, the radical activist Adolf Brand made a stand in Germany for five months after the book burnings, but in November 1933 he had given up gay activism. On 28 June 1934 Hitler conducted a purge of gay men in the ranks of the SA wing of the Nazis, which involved murdering them in the Night of the Long Knives. This was then followed by stricter laws on homosexuality and the round-up of gay men. The address lists seized from the Institute are believed to have aided Hitler in these actions.

Many tens of thousands of arrestees found themselves, ultimately, in slave-labour or death camps. That included some of the institute's staff, such as August Bessunger. Karl Giese committed suicide in 1938 when the Germans invaded Czechoslovakia; his heir, lawyer Karl Fein, was murdered in 1942 during deportation. Arthur Kronfeld and Felix Abraham also committed suicide. Many survived by fleeing Germany. Among them were Berndt Götz, Ludwig Levy-Lenz, Bernard Schapiro, and Max Hodann.

A handful of staff for the institute stayed behind during Nazi rule, such as Hans Graaz. Friedrich Hauptstein, Arthur Röser, and Ewald Lausch even became Nazi collaborators. It is suspected that these may have been spies. Helene Helling, a tenant and receptionist, became a Nazi sympathizer following the raid and occupied the building for some time after it. However, the institute's buildings were a bombed-out ruin by 1944, and were demolished sometime in the mid-1950s. 

Hirschfeld tried to re-establish his institute in Paris as the Institut Français des Sciences Sexologiques, but dissolved it in 1934 after it failed to gain traction. He moved to Nice, and died in France in 1935. He was buried at the Cimetière orthodoxe de Caucade.

After World War II
The charter of the institute had specified that in the event of dissolution, any assets of the Dr. Magnus Hirschfeld Foundation (which had sponsored the institute since 1924) were to be donated to the Humboldt University of Berlin. Hirschfeld also wrote a personal will while in exile in Paris, leaving any remaining assets to his students and heirs Karl Giese and Li Shiu Tong (Tao Li) for the continuation of his work. However, neither stipulation was carried out. The West German courts found that the foundation's dissolution and the seizure of property by the Nazis in 1934 was legal. The West German legislature also retained the Nazi amendments to Paragraph 175, making it impossible for surviving gay men to claim restitution for the destroyed cultural center.

Li Shiu Tong lived in Switzerland and the United States until 1956, but as far as is known, he did not attempt to continue Hirschfeld's work. Some remaining fragments of data from the library were later collected by W. Dorr Legg and ONE, Inc. in the USA in the 1950s.

Later developments 
In 1973, a new Institut für Sexualwissenschaft was opened at the University of Frankfurt am Main (director: Volkmar Sigusch), and 1996 at the Humboldt University of Berlin.

References
Notes

Bibliography
 
 
 

Further reading
 Isherwood, Christopher. (1976) Christopher and His Kind, 1929-1939, 1st edition. Farrar, Straus and Giroux. Full text on OpenLibrary.
 Blasius, Mark and Phelan, Shane ed. (1997) We Are Everywhere: A Historical Source Book of Gay and Lesbian Politics (See the chapter: "The Emergence of a Gay and Lesbian Political Culture in Germany" by James D. Steakley).
 Grau, Günter ed. (1995) Hidden Holocaust? Gay and Lesbian Persecution in Germany 1933-45.
 Lauritsen, John and Thorstad, David (1995) The Early Homosexual Rights Movement (1864-1935). (Second Edition revised)
 Steakley, James D. (9 June 1983) "Anniversary of a Book Burning". pp.18–19, 57. The Advocate (Los Angeles)
 Marhoefer, Laurie. (2015) Sex and the Weimar Republic: German Homosexual Emancipation and the Rise of the Nazis. University of Toronto Press.
 Taylor, Michael Thomas; Timm, Annette F.; Herrn, Rainer eds. (2017) Not Straight From Germany: Sexual Publics and Sexual Citizenship Since Magnus Hirschfeld. JSTOR: 10.3998/mpub.9238370.

Film
 Rosa von Praunheim, director (Germany, 2001) The Einstein of Sex (A biographical drama about Magnus Hirschfeld - English subtitled version available).

External links

 "Institute for Sexual Science (1919-1933)" Online exhibition of the Magnus Hirschfeld Society - warning, complex JavaScript and pop-up windows.
Documentation in the Archive for Sexology, Berlin
 When Books Burn  - University of Arizona multimedia exhibit.

First homosexual movement
Magnus Hirschfeld
Sexology organizations
Persecution of homosexuals in Nazi Germany
Transgender studies
Sexual orientation and medicine
Scientific organizations established in 1919
1919 establishments in Germany
Organizations disestablished in 1933
1933 disestablishments in Germany
Medical research institutes in Germany
Medical and health organisations based in Berlin
Education in Nazi Germany
Research institutes established in 1919
Companies acquired from Jews under Nazi rule